The Macdonald Monument is a monument to John A. Macdonald, first Prime Minister of Canada, by sculptor George Edward Wade (1853-1933), located at Place du Canada in Montreal, Quebec, Canada.

Work 
At the top, an allegorical female figure carrying a horn of plenty represents Canada. Below, the children symbolize the seven provinces that made up Canada at the time. The bronze is housed under a stone baldachin replete with copper bas reliefs of industrial and agricultural trades practised in the Dominion he first commanded. While the plaza is arranged along the skewed cardinality characteristic of Montreal, Macdonald looks west-northwest, under a canopy created by trades, at the vast expanse awaiting the command coming from Montreal. Also, he faces off against the tribute to Sir Wilfrid Laurier, across the street in what is now Dorchester Square.

The two cannons flanking the monument were used at Sevastopol in the Crimean War and were a gift from Queen Victoria to the City of Montreal in 1892, to mark the 250th anniversary of the founding of the city.

History  
The monument was unveiled by John Hamilton-Gordon, Earl of Aberdeen, Governor General of Canada on 6 June 1895.

Vandalism and calls for removal
Reassessments of Macdondald's role in Canadian history, particularly his assimilationist policies toward Indigenous Canadians and racist views of Asian immigrants, led to statues of Macdonald being removed and sometimes vandalized in other cities in the first decades of the 21st century. Since 2017, the Monument has itself been subjected to repeated vandalism, and was painted blue during an Extinction Rebellion protest.

Renewed calls for removal

In the midst of the 2020 protests against racism and police brutality, which took place worldwide in solidarity with those following the murder of George Floyd while in police custody, and the removal of Confederate Army statues in the United States, Canadian cities have seen a rise in calls to remove Macdonald statues, and those of others linked to Canada's colonial legacy. Early in June, it was reported that the Monument was on a list of fifteen statues across Canada subject to petition for removal, with a Change.org petition begun in Montreal calling for the Monument's removal having garnered 2100 signatures as of 8 June. On 29 August 2020, during a defund the police protest, the statue in the monument was vandalized, toppled and inadvertently decapitated. Montreal Mayor Valérie Plante condemned the actions and said the city plans to restore the statue.

Gallery

See also 
 List of monuments and memorials removed during the George Floyd protests

References

External links
  
 Inauguration of Montréal's Monument to the late Right Hon. Sir John Macdonald, G.C.B., by His Excellency the Earl of Aberdeen, Governor-General of Canada, June 6th, 1895 

Allegorical sculptures in Canada
Bronze sculptures in Canada
Buildings and structures completed in 1895
Copper sculptures
John A. Macdonald
Monuments and memorials in Montreal
Outdoor sculptures in Montreal
Sculptures of men in Canada
Sculptures of women in Canada
Cultural depictions of Canadian men
Statues of politicians
Cultural depictions of politicians
Vandalized works of art in Canada
Statues removed in 2020